The discography of In Flames, a Swedish heavy metal band formed in the early 1990s, consists of fourteen studio albums, two live album, eight extended plays, thirty-one singles, two video albums, and forty-six music videos. Signed with Wrong Again Records, In Flames released their full-length debut, Lunar Strain (1994), followed by the EP Subterranean (1995). After signing to Nuclear Blast, they released The Jester Race (1996). The following year, they issued their second EP, Black-Ash Inheritance, and the full-length album Whoracle. The band's fourth studio album, Colony (1999), reached the top 30 in Sweden and Finland. Clayman followed in the same vein the next year, reaching the top 20 in the same countries. The tour to promote it was released as The Tokyo Showdown (2001) live album, which also charted in Sweden and Finland, breaking the top 40. Reroute to Remain (2002) peaked at number 5 on the Swedish and Finnish charts, and number 10 on the Billboard Independent Albums chart. The album was accompanied by the band's first single, "Cloud Connected", which failed to chart.

In 2003, In Flames released Trigger, an EP that features the title track backed with a remix, a cover of Genesis' "Land of Confusion", and two music videos. It was followed by Soundtrack to Your Escape in 2004, which peaked at number 3 in Sweden, and number 7 on the Billboard Independent Albums chart. The album produced a single for "The Quiet Place", which followed the success of the album and reached number 2 in their home country. Used & Abused: In Live We Trust (2005), was the band's debut video album, and their first release to top the Swedish chart. Following the same blueprint, Come Clarity (2006) topped the Finnish and Swedish charts, and reached number 2 on the Billboard Top Independent Albums, number 6 in Germany, as well as the top 30 in three additional European countries. The album was backed by the single "Come Clarity", which was released in a limited edition that reached number 52 in their home country. Before they released their ninth studio album, In Flames issued the single "The Mirror's Truth", which peaked at number 5 in Finland. Their ninth studio album, A Sense of Purpose (2008), topped the Swedish and Billboard Independent Albums charts, and reached top 10 in Austria, Finland, and Germany. In Flames were featured on Pendulum's 2010 album Immersion, on a song called "Self vs Self". In Flames signed with Century Media after completing their recording contract with Nuclear Blast in 2011. Sounds of a Playground Fading was then issued as the band's tenth studio album, peaking at number 1 in Germany. It debuted and peaked at number 27 on the Billboard 200, becoming their highest charting album in the United States, with a single, "Where the Dead Ships Dwell", reaching number 35 on the Billboard Mainstream Rock chart. As of 2011, In Flames have sold over 2.5 million albums worldwide.

Albums

Studio albums

Live albums

Extended plays

Singles

Videos

Video albums

Music videos

Notes

References
General

 In Flames – Discography
 
 
 
 

Specific

External links

Heavy metal group discographies
Discography
Discographies of Swedish artists